Myles Pritchard (born 27 August 1958) is a Bahamian sailor. He competed in the Star event at the 1996 Summer Olympics.

References

External links
 

1958 births
Living people
Bahamian male sailors (sport)
Olympic sailors of the Bahamas
Sailors at the 1996 Summer Olympics – Star
Place of birth missing (living people)